Malhub (foaled 26 April 1998) is an American-bred, British-trained Thoroughbred racehorse. He is a son of Kingmambo and won the Golden Jubilee Stakes at Royal Ascot in 2002.

1998 racehorse births
Racehorses bred in the United States
Racehorses trained in the United Kingdom
Thoroughbred family 16-f